Kudumangalore  is a village in the southern state of Karnataka, India. It is located in the kushalnagar taluk of Kodagu district.

Demographics
 India census, Kudumangalore had a population of 8252 with 4209 males and 4043 females.

See also
 Mangalore
 Kodagu
 Districts of Karnataka

References

External links
 http://Kodagu.nic.in/

Villages in Kodagu district